Nothofagin is a dihydrochalcone. It is a C-linked phloretin glucoside found in rooibos (Aspalathus linearis)
and New Zealand red beech (Nothofagus fusca).  It is a phenolic antioxidant.

References

External links

Dihydrochalcone glycosides
Glucosides
Polyphenols